The 1997–98 I-Divisioona season was the 24th season of the I-Divisioona, the second level of Finnish ice hockey. 12 teams participated in the league, and Kärpät Oulu won the championship. The top six teams from the regular season qualified for the promotion and relegation round of the SM-liiga.

Regular season

Relegation 
 Ahmat Hyvinkää - KooKoo 3:2 (5:2, 2:4, 3:4, 4:3, 3:0)
 Koo-Vee - Jää-Kotkat Uusikaupunki 2:3 (2:4, 4:3, 1:0, 3:4 OT, 4:5 OT)

External links 
 Season on hockeyarchives.info

I-Divisioona seasons
Fin
2